Porter Heights is a census-designated place (CDP) in Montgomery County, Texas, United States. The population was 1,903 at the 2020 census.

Geography
Porter Heights is located at  (30.150324, -95.317496).

Demographics

As of the 2020 United States census, there were 1,903 people, 420 households, and 373 families residing in the CDP.

As of the 2010 United States Census, there were 1,490 people, 562 households, and 423 families residing in the CDP. The racial makeup of the CDP was 85.7% White, 0.7% African American, 2.2% Native American, 0.3% Asian, 8.8% from other races, and 2.2% from two or more races. Hispanic or Latino of any race were 23.3% of the population.

There were 562 households, out of which 32.2% had children under the age of 18 living with them, 55.3% were married couples living together, 11.6% had a female householder with no husband present, and 24.7% were non-families. 19.6% of all households were made up of individuals. The average household size was 2.94 and the average family size was 3.37.

In the CDP, the population was spread out, with 27.0% under the age of 18, 8.3% from 18 to 24, 23.7% from 25 to 44, 29.5% from 45 to 64, and 11.5% who were 65 years of age or older. The median age was 38.0 years. For every 100 females, there were 107.4 males. For every 100 females age 18 and over, there were 108.1 males.

As of the 2000 United States Census, the median income for a household in the CDP was $37,262, and the median income for a family was $41,615. Males had a median income of $36,522 versus $30,378 for females. The per capita income for the CDP was $16,997. About 4.4% of families and 4.3% of the population were below the poverty line, including none of those under age 18 and 13.6% of those age 65 or over.

Transportation
Farm to Market Road 1314 forms the northeastern boundary of the CDP. To the southeast, its terminus is Porter. To the northwest, its terminus is located inside Conroe. It is also known as Conroe Porter Road.

FM 1314 also connects Porter Heights to the Grand Parkway, which is the outermost beltway around Houston.

A small general aviation airfield called North Houston Airport lies within the CDP.

Education
Some areas of Porter Heights are zoned to the New Caney Independent School District. Some areas of Porter Heights are zoned to the Conroe Independent School District.

Residents of the New Caney ISD section are zoned to Crippen Elementary School, White Oak Middle School, and Porter High School. Before the opening of Porter High School in 2010, students attended New Caney High School. Sixth graders previously attended the New Caney 6th Grade Campus.

Residents of the Conroe ISD section are zoned to San Jacinto Elementary School, Grangerland Intermediate School, Moorhead Junior High School, and Caney Creek High School.

The Texas Legislature designated both New Caney ISD and Conroe ISD (and therefore all of Porter Heights) as part of Lone Star College (formerly the North Harris Montgomery Community College District).

References

Census-designated places in Montgomery County, Texas
Census-designated places in Texas
Greater Houston